Richard "Richie" Williams (born June 3, 1970) is an American former professional soccer player and coach.

Known for his diminutive height and his dogged tackling, Williams spent the vast majority of his playing career in the United States, playing one season in the National Professional Soccer League, two in USISL, two in the USL A-League, and eight in Major League Soccer, most notably for MetroStars and D.C. United. He also earned 20 caps for the United States men's national soccer team.

Since the end of his playing career, Williams has been involved in coaching, and spent time as the interim head coach of New York Red Bulls and coaching various United States national youth teams. He is now assistant coach of the New England Revolution in Major League Soccer.

Playing career

Early career
Williams was born in Middletown Township, New Jersey and attended Mater Dei High School. Williams' career has been closely tied to Bruce Arena, former coach of the United States men's national team. Arena first coached Williams at the University of Virginia. The two parted ways after Williams graduated. In 1992, Williams signed with Buffalo Blizzard in the National Professional Soccer League.  He played thirty games for the Blizzard during the 1992-1993 winter indoor season.  In the spring of 1993, he signed with the Richmond Kickers of the USISL.  That fall, he moved to Ayr United in Scottish Football League but then came back to the United States, signing with the Richmond Kickers of the USISL in 1994.  Williams played two seasons with the Kickers, helping them to the 1995 U.S. Open Cup and USISL titles.

Major League Soccer
In February 1996, Williams was drafted by D.C. United head coach Bruce Arena in the fourth round of the 1996 MLS Inaugural Player Draft. Making up for his height with his ferocious shadowing of the opponent's top playmaker, he became an integral member of the early DC teams, helping them to three MLS Cup titles.

Williams was traded to MetroStars for Mike Ammann in 2001, spent a year there and was sent back to D.C. for Brian Kamler. His MLS career ended with the Metros in a trade with Eddie Pope and Jaime Moreno for Mike Petke, a draft pick, and an allocation before the 2003 season. Williams tallied just eight goals and added 33 assists in 216 regular season games in MLS (plus two goals and four assists in 26 playoff games).

Williams signed with his original American team Richmond Kickers which then played in the USL A-League, prior to the 2004 season, but left the club in September 2005 after disagreements with the coach Leigh Cowlishaw, and retired from playing shortly thereafter.

International
Williams earned his first cap for the United States on November 6, 1998, against Australia, and went on to appear 20 times for the national team.

Honors

United States
CONCACAF Gold Cup (1): 2002

D.C. United
MLS Cup Winners (3): 1996, 1997, 1999
MLS Supporters' Shield Winners (2): 1997, 1999
U.S. Open Cup Winners (1): 1996
CONCACAF Champions' Cup Winners (1): 1998
InterAmerican Cup Winners (1): 1998

Richmond Kickers
USISL Premier League Champions: 1995
US Open Cup Champions: 1995
James River Cup: 2004, 2005

Coaching career
Williams spent several years as an assistant coach at his alma mater, the University of Virginia, before being named an assistant coach with the MetroStars in January 2006. In June 2006, Williams was named interim head coach of the re-branded New York Red Bulls, and went back as assistant following former United States men's national soccer team head coach Bruce Arena's appointment with the club. He remained as the club's top assistant coach, until he was once again called on to serve as the club's interim coach replacing Juan Carlos Osorio for the remaining eight matches of the 2009 season.
Williams was retained by Red Bulls as an assistant coach for the 2010 season before being abruptly fired just three weeks before the start of the 2011 MLS season.

In October 2011, Williams was hired as the head coach of the U-18 national team.  Three months later he was named head coach of the United States men's national under-17 soccer team.
After the 2015 FIFA U-17 World Cup, Williams departed the program.

In January 2019, Williams was hired as the head coach of Loudoun United FC in the USL Championship. He left the team on May 30 to take a job as an assistant coach for the New England Revolution.

Managerial stats

References

External links
 MetroFan player profile

1970 births
Living people
American soccer coaches
American soccer players
American expatriate soccer players
Ayr United F.C. players
Buffalo Blizzard players
D.C. United players
New York Red Bulls players
National Professional Soccer League (1984–2001) players
New York Red Bulls coaches
Richmond Kickers players
Virginia Cavaliers men's soccer coaches
Virginia Cavaliers men's soccer players
United States men's under-20 international soccer players
United States men's under-23 international soccer players
United States men's international soccer players
USISL players
USL First Division players
1999 FIFA Confederations Cup players
2000 CONCACAF Gold Cup players
2002 CONCACAF Gold Cup players
CONCACAF Gold Cup-winning players
Soccer players from New Jersey
Mater Dei High School (New Jersey) alumni
People from Middletown Township, New Jersey
Sportspeople from Monmouth County, New Jersey
Major League Soccer players
Major League Soccer All-Stars
A-League (1995–2004) players
New York Red Bulls non-playing staff
Association football midfielders
USL Championship coaches
Loudoun United FC